Vasilisa may refer to:
Vasilisa (name), a given name (and a list of people and characters with the name)
Vasilisa (2014 film), a Russian historical film with Svetlana Khodchenkova
Vasilisa (2000 film), a German-Russian film featuring Simon Verhoeven and Nina Hagen

See also
Vasilisa the Beautiful, Russian fairy tale
Vasilisa the Beautiful (1939 film), Russian film
Vasilisa the Beautiful (1977 film), Russian animation film
Basilissa (disambiguation)
Vasilissa (disambiguation)